Amanita caesarea, commonly known as  Caesar's mushroom, is a highly regarded edible mushroom in the genus Amanita, native to southern Europe and North Africa. While it was first described by Giovanni Antonio Scopoli in 1772, this mushroom was a known favorite of early rulers of the Roman Empire.

It has a distinctive orange cap, yellow gills and stipe. Organic acids have been isolated from this species. Similar orange-capped species occur in North America and India. It was known to and valued by the Ancient Romans, who called it Boletus, a name now applied to a very different type of fungus.

Although it is edible, the Caesar's mushroom is closely related to the psychoactive fly agaric, and to the deadly poisonous death cap and destroying angels.

Taxonomy and naming
Amanita caesarea was first described by Italian mycologist Giovanni Antonio Scopoli in 1772 as Agaricus caesareus, before later being placed in Amanita by Persoon in 1801. The common name comes from its being a favourite of the Roman emperors, who took the name Caesar (originally a family name) as a title. It was a personal favorite of Roman emperor Claudius. The Romans called it Bōlētus, derived from the Ancient Greek βωλίτης for this fungus as named by Galen. Several modern common names recognise this heritage with the English Caesar's mushroom and royal amanita, French impériale, Polish cesarski and German Kaiserling. In Italian, it is ovolo (pl. ovoli), due to its resemblance to an egg when very young. In Albanian it is kuqëlorja from its colour (< Albanian kuqe 'red'). Other common names include Amanite des Césars and Oronge.

It has also been classified as A. umbonata.  A. hemibapha is a similar species originally described from Sikkim, India. It is widely eaten in the Himalayas and the Tibetan areas. Also North American collections have been labeled in the past as A. hemibapha. The relationship of the similar North American species A. arkansana and A. jacksonii to A. caesarea is not clear. The edibility of some of these similar species is also unclear, though A. jacksonii is eaten by many and there have been no reports of illness from it. A similar mushroom can also be found in La Esperanza, Honduras, where a festival is celebrated annually in its honor. A. caesarea was first domesticated in 1984.

Description

This mushroom has an orange-red cap, initially hemispherical before convex and finally flat. The surface is smooth, and margins striated, and it can reach  or rarely  in diameter. The ring hangs loosely and is lined above and smooth below. The base of the stipe is thicker than the top and is seated in a greyish-white cup-like volva, which is a remnant of universal veil. The spores are white.

It could be confused with the poisonous fly agaric (Amanita muscaria). Though A. muscaria has a distinctive red cap dotted with fluffy white flakes, these tend to fall off as the carpophore ages and the bright red tends to fade to a yellowy orange. The latter mushroom will always have white gills and stalk with a ringed volva rather than a yellow stalk and is typically associated with spruce (Picea), pine (Pinus) or birch (Betula). Certain varieties (e.g. Amanita muscaria var. guessowii) are close to yellow even at the juvenile stage.

Chemical properties

An investigation of the heavy metal content of mushroom samples found cadmium levels in A. caesarea four times greater than allowed in cultivated mushrooms by EU standards. The amount of lead in A. caesarea also exceeded allowed levels. The study concluded that the accumulation of heavy metals may be a species-specific property of mushrooms, and that chronic consumption of some mushroom types could potentially be harmful.

A study of the organic acid composition of mushrooms found a relatively high level, about 6 g/kg, in A. caesarea. Malic acid, ascorbic acid, citric acid, ketoglutaric acid, fumaric acid, shikimic  acid and traces of succinic acid were detected. Malic and ascorbic acids were the most abundant compounds. Ergosterol has also been isolated from A. caesarea.

Edibility
Amanita caesarea is a highly appreciated mushroom in Europe. It is traditionally gathered and consumed in Italy, where it is known as ovolo or ovolo buono or "fungo reale". It has been traditionally taken as food in Mexico. There it is consumed roasted with a bit of the herb epazote, Dysphania ambrosioides. The international export market developed in the 1990s.

Distribution and habitat

It is found in southern Europe and North Africa, particularly in the hills of northern Italy. It is thought to have been introduced north of the Alps by the Roman armies as it is most frequently found along old Roman roads. The mushroom is also distributed in the Balkans, Hungary, India, Iran and China (Sichuan Province). Although the species is not known to exist in the United States and Canada, it has been collected in Mexico.

In Europe, Amanita caesarea inhabits primarily oak forests (Quercetum troianae Em. et Ht., Quercetum frainetto-cerris Rudsky. and Quercetum frainetto-cerris macedonicum Oberd., e.g.). It grows individually or in groups from early summer to mid autumn. In warmer climates this mushroom fruits in higher oak woodlands, sometimes mixed with conifers.

Amanita caesarea is listed in the Red Data book of Ukraine, and it is protected by law in Croatia, Slovenia, the Czech Republic and Germany.

See also
List of Amanita species

Gallery

References

External links

 Photos and description of A. caesarea
 Photos and description of related North American species, with some discussion of relationships
 Classification problems of this mushroom
  Amanita caesarea from Portugal with photos and information

caesarea
Edible fungi
Fungi of Africa
Fungi of Europe
Fungi of Mexico
Fungi described in 1772